Kurasawa Pond is a pond in the northwestern part of the Labyrinth of Wright Valley, McMurdo Dry Valleys, Antarctica. The pond was named by the Advisory Committee on Antarctic Names (2004) after Hajime Kurasawa of the Japan Geological Survey, a participant in the McMurdo Dry Valleys Drilling Project in the 1973–74 and 1974–75 field seasons.

References

Lakes of Victoria Land
McMurdo Dry Valleys